The 2009 ANZAC test, was a rugby league test match played between Australia and New Zealand at the Suncorp Stadium in Brisbane on 8 May 2009. It was the 10th Anzac test played between the two nations since the first was played under the Super League banner in 1997. This was the fourth Anzac Test played in Brisbane.

This was the 112th test between Australia and New Zealand since 1908.

Squads

Match Summary

References

2009 in Australian rugby league
2009 in New Zealand rugby league
Anzac Test
Rugby league in Brisbane
International rugby league competitions hosted by Australia